Senator Weatherford may refer toL

James K. Weatherford (1850–1935), Oregon State Senate
Zadoc L. Weatherford (1888–1983), Alabama State Senate
Chuck Weaver (born 1956), Illinois State Senate
Isaac Weaver Jr. (1756–1830), Pennsylvania State Senate
Richard Weaver (American politician) (1827–1906), Wisconsin State Senate
Stanley B. Weaver (1925–2003), Illinois State Senate
Zebulon Weaver (1872–1948), North Carolina State Senate